Anna Victoria Litvinenko (born 15 February 2001) is a British former figure skater and 2017 Team GB member. She is a five-time junior medallist at the British national championships and has most notably competed at the 2015 ISU Junior Grand Prix in the United States, the 2016 ISU Junior Grand Prix in Slovenia, the 2016 ISU CS Warsaw Cup, the 2017 ISU Junior Grand Prix in Latvia, the 2017 ISU CS Finlandia Trophy, the 2018 ISU Junior Grand Prix in Lithuania and the 2018 CS Inge Solar Memorial – Alpen Trophy. In 2017 she was named Youth Sports Personality of the Year (Denninberg Shield) by Sport Godalming.

Litvinenko was coached by Veronika Bogomolova at the Guildford IFSC in Guildford, England.

Career

Early career
Litvinenko began ice skating in 2008 at the age of seven, after receiving ice skates as a present. 
She began skating internationally in 2011, and first skated at the British national championships in the 2012–13 season, ultimately reaching number 1 in the national rankings at the advanced novice level in 2013.

Junior career
At the junior level, Litvinenko's international debut was at the 2014 Merano Cup, where she was placed 11th. 
In the 2015–16 season, she went on to achieve podium positions at both the Tirnavia Edea Ice Cup and the Golden Bear of Zagreb.
She also debuted in the ISU Junior Grand Prix series in the 2015–16 season, placing 20th in the United States. 
In the 2016–17 season, she continued in the JGP series and was placed 20th in Slovenia. 
She was placed on podium positions at the British national championships in five consecutive seasons: she was awarded the silver medal in the 2014–15 season and bronze medals in the 2015–16, 2016–17, 2017-18 and 2018-19 seasons. 
She was selected to represent Great Britain at the 2017 European Youth Olympic Winter Festival in Erzurum, Turkey. She has also placed first at the Tirnavia Ice Cup in both the 2017-18 and 2018-19 seasons.

Senior career
At the senior level, Litvinenko made her international debut at the 2016 Denkova-Staviski Cup, where she was awarded the bronze medal. 
She also came in 8th place at the 2017 Skate Helena competition.
In the 2016–17 season, she debuted in the ISU Challenger Series, achieving 18th place in Poland.
She was placed 6th in the British national championships in the same season. She was placed 15th in Finland and 23rd in Austria in the ISU Challenger Series in the 2017-18 and 2018-19 seasons respectively. She was placed 7th in the British national championships in the 2018–19 season.

She announced her retirement from the sport in December 2020.

Programs

Competitive highlights
CS: Challenger Series; JGP: Junior Grand Prix

References

External links 
 
 

English female single skaters
2001 births
Living people